Tegal is a city in the northwest part of Central Java of Indonesia. It had a population of 239,599 at the 2010 Census and 276,734 at the 2015 Census. Its built-up (or metro) area made up of Tegal Municipality and 12 districts spread over Tegal and Brebes Regencies was home to 1,366,858 inhabitants as of 2010 census. It is administratively separate from Tegal Regency, which borders it to the south and east; Brebes Regency borders it to the west.

Tegal Regency remained a major sugar production center until the mid-20th century. The city served as a port for exporting sugar produced on the nearby plantations. Tegal is famous for its warung, commonly called "warteg" or warung tegal. It is also known for its tea products, such as teh botol Sosro, Tong Tji tea, 2 Tang tea, Gopek tea and other brands.

History 

The city of Tegal developed from a small village called Tetegual. The modernization of the village began in the early 1530s, and it eventually became part of the Pekalongan Regency, which admitted the existence of the Pajang Empire in Central Java. The Pajang Empire was the successor of the Sultanate of Demak.

The city was founded by Ki Gede Sebayu. Together with the local people, he aspired to increase the region's agriculture, exploiting its fertile soil. Because of his efforts to develop the region, he became the high leader and the symbol of the city. His coronation as leader was held simultaneously with a traditional festival celebrating a rich agricultural harvest. In accordance with district ordinance no. 5/1988, July 28 is the anniversary of the city of Tegal.

In the 1920s, the city was a center of activism for the Communist Party of Indonesia (PKI), and the radical leaders of the Tegal branch of the PKI were among the instigators of the 1926 rebellion that led to the temporary destruction of that party.

On October 8, 1945, an anti-feudalism movement called Gerakan Tiga Daerah ("Three Regions Movement") was established in Tegal, Pekalongan, and Brebes. Its goal was to replace the blue-blood regents (related to the kings of Yogyakarta and Surakarta) with ordinary people. According to the leaders of this movement, the old regents had cooperated with the Japanese during World War II and sent people to Japanese slave labor camps. The main leader of Gerakan Tiga Daerah was Sarjiyo, who became the new regent of Pekalongan. Others were Kutil, K. Mijaya and Ir. Sakirman. Ir Sakirman was the local leader of the PKI. The government of the Republic of Indonesia in Yogyakarta opposed Gerakan Tiga Daerah and declared it illegal.

Gerakan Tiga Daerah had the old regents arrested, stripped naked and dragged into prison. Other government officials and police officers were kidnapped and massacred at Talang bridge. The Gerakan Tiga Daerah also provoked a racial riot against ethnic Chinese in Brebes. On November 4, 1945, the movement attacked the Indonesian army headquarters and the regent office in Pekalongan. The rebels were defeated by the Indonesian army in a fierce battle on December 21, 1945, and most of their leaders were arrested and imprisoned. This rebellion is called the Three Regions Affair.

During the unrest following the resignation of President Suharto in 1998, Tegal was the site of extensive protests and occasional violence against local government officials, especially in June 1998.

Tegal has faced issues relating to political corruption. In the late 2010s, two consecutive mayors of the city - Ikmal Jaya and Siti Masitha Soeparno - were both arrested and removed from office by the Corruption Eradication Commission.

Administrative division

Tegal Town Hall as the administrative center of Tegal City originally occupied the Resident Building on Jl. The young man who is now used for the Parliament Building Tegal City. But since 1985, the center of government moved to Pendopo Ki Gede Sebayu former Pendopo Tegal regency, in the area of Alun-alun Mangkukusuman. Colonel Laut (Ret.) Adi Winarso, S. Sos is Tegal's first son who served as mayor for two periods, 1999 - 2004 and 2004 - 2009 through an indirect election. The year 2008 marks a new history of the leadership of Tegal City, because in that year also for the first time a mayor and deputy mayor were directly elected by the people of Tegal City. As a result, Ikmal Jaya, SE Ak and Ali Zainal Abidin, SE won the election. They were inaugurated on March 23, 2009, by the Governor of Central Java, Bibit Waluyo.
Tegal City is divided into 4 districts (kecamatan) and sub-divided into 27 administrative villages (kelurahan) as follows:

Geography
Tegal City is located on the north coast road (pantura) of Central Java, located 165 km west of Semarang City or 329 km east of Jakarta, lies between 109 ° 08 '- 109 ° 10' East Longitude and 6 ° 50 '- 6 ° 53' South latitude, with an area of 39.68 km2 or approximately 3,968 hectares. Tegal City is located in the Pantura region, from the orientation map of Central Java Province located in the Western Region, with the farthest spans north to south 6.7 km and west to east 9.7 km. Seen from geographical location, Tegal's position is very strategic as a liaison of cross-national and regional economic path in Pantura region that is from west to east (Jakarta-Tegal-Semarang-Surabaya) with middle and south area Pulai Jawaa (Jakarta-Tegal-Purwokerto-Yogyakarta- Surabaya) and vice versa.

Climate
Tegal has a tropical monsoon climate (Am) with moderate to little rainfall from June to October and heavy to very heavy rainfall from November to May.

Economy
Trade and services are the main sectors of the economy of Tegal City. The city became the final processing and marketing of various products from the western part of Central Java. Small and medium enterprises are quite rapid progress is the home metal industry in the area of Jl. Cempaka, and Tegalan batik handicrafts in Kalinyamat Village. To support the economic pulse, the city government of Tegal has built the Center for Promotion and Business Information (PPIB).

Language
Tegal has its own language, known as Bahasa Tegal. Tegal language has a resemblance to the language of Banyumas ( ngapak ) that is in the vocabulary. However, people in Tegal are reluctant to use ngapak as a term of the language, due to their dialectical difference. People using Tegal language include: northern part of Tegal regency, Tegal City, western part of Pemalang regency, and eastern part of Brebes district. The first Tegal language Congress was held by the Tegal City government on April 4, 2006, at the Bahari Inn hotel. The event which was initiated by Yono Daryono presented several figures such as SN Ratmana (cerpenis), Ki Enthus Susmono (dalang Tegal), Eko Tunas (Tegal poet), Dwi Ery Santoso (Poetry and Director). The purpose of the congress was to raise the status of the Tegalan dialect into Tegal language. Some Indonesian comedians speak it because its accent and dialect arouse amusement. One example is the translation of the greeting phrase "How are you?" into "Kepriben kabare?".

Greetings
It is common practice for people in Tegal to call their friends "Jon", "Jack" or "Jakwir". The translation for "Daddy" is Jasak, "Mommy" is Jok, a younger brother is addressed as Yarig and an older brother as Sahang. Many other words can only be understood by native Tegals. Bahasa Tegal also has many Arabic loan words.

Interesting places and buildings
 Gunung Guci: natural sulfur waterfalls for healing many skin diseases;
 Pantai Alam Indah (PAI): a famous beach in Tegal;
 Alun-alun Tegal: in front of Mesjid Agung Tegal mosque;
 Pasar Pagi Tegal: the biggest market in Tegal;
 Bird Market: in Pasar Senggol next to Alun-alun area;
 Taman Poci: a small park with children's playground and picnic area in front of the station, with kiosks selling exotic foods and Teh Poci tea;

Historical buildings in the city of Tegal mostly Dutch architecture,
 Tegal railway station: connecting many other big cities in Java.
The Dance Building (Lanal Tegal) was established in 1914.
Stoomtram Maatschappij Semarang-Cheribon Building established since 1913, this building was once used as a campus of Pancasakti University Tegal.
Parliament Building (Jl. Pemuda)
City Hall and the mayor's office (Ki Gede Sebayu No.12, Komplek Alun-alun Mangkukusuman)
Post Office (Jl Proklamasi No.01)
Navy Headquarters (Jl Proklamasi)
Water Tower (Pancasila Street)
Birao Building SCS (Jl Pancasila)
Gedung Pancasakti University
The Sacred Heart of Jesus Parish Catholic Church
Temple Tek Hay Kiong (Gurami Street)

Notable people

Ahmad Muzani (b. 1968), politician
Nursholeh (b. 1957), mayor between 2017 and 2019
Suswono (b. 1959), politician
Joseph Theodorus Suwatan (b. 1940), bishop of Manado
Simon Santoso (b. 1985), badminton player
Imam Tantowi (b. 1946), film director and screenwriter
Pah Wongso (1904–1975), Chinese Indonesian social worker
Willem Thomas de Vogel (18631955), colonial physician and official

References

External links 

  Military History Centre/Three regions affair
  Military History Centre/Battle on December 21, 1945

 
Populated places in Central Java
Port cities and towns in Indonesia